Gabriëlle Demedts (Wielsbeke, June 11, 1909 – Kortrijk, September 6, 2002) was a Flemish Belgian poet. She was a sibling of André Demedts. In 1934 she wrote her first poems and in 1937 she published her first work "Een gevangene zingt" (The prisoner sings). As a young child she was struck by Poliomyelitis which has determined the rest of her life.
In a book about the Declercq family, one can read that some of Demedts’ poems have been inspired by life-changing events in her life and that of the Declercqs.
She wrote, for instance, '’Rustig lied’' (quiet song)  and '’Lage tonen'’ (low vibes)  after a love break-up of her friend Valentine Declercq, or '’Zomer’' (Summer)  when Valentine was severely ill and dying. Later, she also wrote a poem, '’Ik heb gedaan...'’ (I am done…), when Ernest Constant Declercq, Valentine’s father and a close friend of Gabrielle Demedts’ parents, had died.

References

Bibliography
 Een gevangene zingt (1937) (The prisoner sings)
 Een twijg in de wind (1939) (A twig in the wind)
 Morgen is alles uit (1940) (Tomorrow all is over)
 Verloren thuis (1946) (Lost home)
 De doorgang (1957) (Trespass)
 Levensberichten en liederen (1974) (Poems and Songs about life)
 Klanken van eeuwigheid in aardse stem (1974) (Songs of eternity in an earthly voice)
 Verzamelde gedichten (1979) (Collected poems)

External links 
 Biography and Bibliography  Iris Van de Casteele, De Poëzietuin, 11 februari 1994
 Biography and Bibliography  Louis' Thuispagina  – VLAAMSE SCHRIJVERS
 Biography and Bibliography gedichten.nl: biografie
 Bibliography Bibliotheek voor de Nederlandse Letteren

1909 births
2002 deaths
20th-century Belgian poets
Belgian women poets
20th-century Belgian women writers